Keysight VEE is a graphical dataflow programming software development environment from Keysight Technologies for automated test, measurement, data analysis and reporting. VEE originally stood for Visual Engineering Environment and developed by HP designated as HP VEE; it has since been officially renamed to Keysight VEE. Keysight VEE has been widely used in various industries, serving the entire stage of a product lifecycle, from design, validation to manufacturing. It is optimized in instrument control and automation with test and measurement devices such as data acquisition instruments like digital voltmeters and oscilloscopes, and source devices like signal generators and programmable power supplies.

Release history

A detailed list of features for each version can be found under the References section.

Keysight VEE objects and pins
A VEE program consists of multiple connected VEE objects (sometimes called devices). Each VEE object consists of different types of pins, namely data pins, sequence pins, execute pins (XEQ), control pins and error pins. Data pins govern the data flow propagation while sequence pins determine object execution order.

The pins on the left side of an object are called input pins, whereas the pins on the right are output pins. Two objects, A and B, are connected if the output pin of object A is connected to object B's input pin. Several connection lines can emanate from a single output pin, but at most one connection line can be attached to an input pin. All data input pins and execute pins must be connected, whereas control pins and output pins can be left unconnected.

Data flow and data propagation
Keysight VEE is a dataflow programming language. Within a VEE program, there are multiple connections between objects and data flows through objects from left to right while sequence flows from top to bottom. 
 When an object executes, it uses the input pin's value to perform an operation. When it finishes, the result is placed on the output pin. The output pin value placed is then propagated to any input pins that are connected to it. 
 A sequence pin is used to specify some object execution order. In most cases, sequence pins are left unconnected to allow data propagation to determine the execution order. If an object's sequence input pin is connected, the object will execute only if all data input pins and the sequence input pin have data. 
 When data is present on execute pins, it will force the object to operate and place results on its output pins, regardless of whether the data inputs have values.
 A control pin is used to control the internal state of an object. It doesn't have effect on data propagation.
 An error pin is used to trap errors when an object execute. If it is present, no error dialog will be shown. When an error occurs, the error pin propagates instead of data output pins, followed by the sequence output pin (if connected).
An object's execution order is determined by object connections and the data dependency rule. In general, an object with unconnected data input and sequence input pin will operate first. 
If an object's sequence input pin is not connected, it will execute as soon as data is present on all data inputs. On the other hand, if a sequence input pin is connected, although data is present on all data input pins, the object will hold its execution until the sequence input pin is pinged. This may not be applicable to some non-primitive objects like the Junction and Collector objects. 
For example, if object A's sequence output pin is connected, it will fire only after object A has executed and no further execution is possible in the objects descended from the data output pins and error pin of object A.

Instrument connectivity 
Keysight VEE can connect and control a variety of Keysight and non-Keysight instrumentation via multiple interfaces. Keysight VEE supports the following interfaces:
	GPIB, LAN, USB and RS-232
	VXI and LXI plug and play drivers
	IVI-COM drivers
	PXI via NI-DAQmx
	SCPI via the DirectIO object
	Panel drivers

Extensive interoperability 
Keysight VEE can interact with other programming languages using the built-in ActiveX Automation Server. Other software development programs such as Visual Basic, C/C++, Visual C# and all .NET compliant languages can call Keysight VEE UserFunctions. Keysight VEE is also integrated with Microsoft .NET Framework (Common Language Runtime and Framework Class Libraries) that provides a multitude of functions and controls that can be used to enhance a program such as adding email capability and accessing databases.
Access to over 2500 MATLAB analysis and visualization functions is made possible with the built-in MATLAB Signal Processing Toolbox.  The built-in Microsoft Excel library provides direct access to save, retrieve and generate reports in spreadsheets.

Keysight VEE GUI panels and runtime deployment

Keysight VEE is notable for its capability to deploy unlimited number of runtime programs with no time limitations at no extra cost. These runtime programs could contain a GUI panel and allows interaction with users, presumably operators to execute and control the program and the test execution.

See also
 Dataflow programming
 Graphical programming
 Virtual instrumentation
 LabVIEW
 MATLAB

References

External links
 Keysight Technologies, Keysight VEE
Keysight Technologies, E-Learning Portal
Keysight Technologies, VEE Software Forums
Keysight Technologies, VEE Pro 30-day free trial download
 Usage of VXIplug&play instrument driver in Agilent VEE

Domain-specific programming languages
Visual programming languages